Lontor may refer to:

 Lontor (island), an Indonesian island
 Lontor (village), a village on the island

See also 
 Lontar (disambiguation)